The Minister of Sport, Culture and Heritage (formerly Minister of Culture, Heritage, Tourism and Sport) is the cabinet position in Manitoba that oversees the Department of Sport, Culture and Heritage. Since January 2023, the Minister has been Obby Khan.

Manitoba Sport, Culture and Heritage—through developing, supporting, promoting, and celebrating the identity and well-being of the province and its communities—manages those government programs and services that support the sport, art, culture, and heritage of Manitoba.

The Minister and the Department are responsible for generating sustainable economic growth based on Manitoba's unique qualities and identity; increasing community capacity to improve well-being; enhancing public access to knowledge and information; encouraging, sharing, and making use of the province’s cultural and heritage resources; building Manitoba’s identity and reputation as a hub for artistic opportunity; and supporting Manitoba’s investments in amateur sport and encourage the hosting of regional, national, and international sport events.

Legislation 
Statutes that are the responsibility of the Minister of Sport, Culture and Heritage, include:

 The Manitoba Advisory Council on Citizenship, Immigration and Multiculturalism Act
 The Amusements Act (except Part II)
 The Archives and Recordkeeping Act
 The Arts Council Act
 The Centre culturel franco-manitobain Act
 The Coat of Arms, Emblems and the Manitoba Tartan Act
 The Combative Sports Act
 The Manitoba Film and Sound Recording Development Corporation Act
 The Foreign Cultural Objects Immunity from Seizure Act
 The Freedom of Information and Protection of Privacy Act
 The Heritage Manitoba Act
 The Heritage Resources Act
 The Income Tax Act (section 10.4)
 The Legislative Library Act
 The Manitoba Multiculturalism Act
 The Manitoba Museum Act
 The Public Libraries Act
 The Queen's Printer Act

History 
The precise ministerial designations related to sport, culture, and/or heritage in Manitoba have changed several times.

The ministerial position can be traced back to 1966, when Attorney-General Sterling Lyon was named as Minister of Tourism and Recreation. The newly-elected government of Edward Schreyer added a separate ministry of Cultural Affairs in 1969, but united the two ministries in 1971. In 1978, a minister in Sterling Lyon's government was given responsibility for Sport.

Responsibility for Tourism was transferred to the Economic Development portfolio in 1979, and was not reunited with Culture until 1999. Culture Ministers were also responsible for Citizenship from 1991 until 1999, when the responsibility was given to the Minister of Labour and Immigration.

Lists of Ministers

See also 

 Minister of Canadian Heritage
 Minister for Sport (Canada)
 Minister responsible for the Status of Women (Manitoba)

References 

Culture, Heritage, Tourism and Sport, Minister of
Manitoba
Manitoba, Minister_of_Culture,_Heritage,_Tourism_and_Sport
Manitoba, Minister_of_Culture,_Heritage,_Tourism_and_Sport